The Lady in Number 6: Music Saved My Life is an Academy Award-winning 2013 documentary-short film directed, written and produced by Malcolm Clarke.

The Lady In Number 6: Music Saved My Life tells the story of Alice Herz-Sommer, a German-speaking Jewish pianist from Prague who was at her death the world's oldest Holocaust survivor. In the documentary, she discusses the importance of music, laughter, and how to have an optimistic outlook on life. Herz (1903–2014) died at age 110, one week before the 86th Academy Awards.

Awards

References

Further reading 
  
  The inspiration for the film.

External links
 
 
 http://insidemovies.ew.com/2014/02/28/oscar-documentary-shorts-the-lady-in-number-6/

2013 films
American short documentary films
British short documentary films
Canadian short documentary films
English-language Canadian films
Best Documentary Short Subject Academy Award winners
Documentary films about old age
Documentary films about the Holocaust
Documentary films about women in music
Films about pianos and pianists
2013 short documentary films
2010s English-language films
2010s Canadian films
2010s American films
2010s British films